Hypersara is a genus of parasitic flies in the family Tachinidae.

Species
Isosturmia aureipollinosa (Chao & Zhou, 1992)
Isosturmia cruciata (Townsend, 1927)
Isosturmia grandis Chao & Sun, 1993
Isosturmia intermedia Townsend, 1927
Isosturmia inversa Townsend, 1927
Isosturmia japonica (Mesnil, 1957)
Isosturmia picta (Baranov, 1932)
Isosturmia pilosa Shima, 1987
Isosturmia pruinosa Chao & Sun, 1992
Isosturmia setamacula (Chao & Liang, 2002)
Isosturmia setula (Liang & Chao, 1990)
Isosturmia spinisurstyla Chao & Liang, 1998.

References

Diptera of Asia
Exoristinae
Tachinidae genera
Taxa named by Charles Henry Tyler Townsend